Reginald Edwin "Reggie" Witherspoon (born May 31, 1985 in Pasadena, California) is an American sprinter. He competed for University of Florida and later Baylor University. He was part of the USA's gold-medal winning team in the men's 4 × 400 m relay at the 2008 Beijing Olympics, after running in the heats. Witherspoon also held the Indoor National High School Record at 400 m, which was held by William Reed, with his time of 46.11 seconds at the 2003 National Scholastic Indoor Championships in New York.

References 
 
 
 
 Reggie Witherspoon at DyeStat 

1985 births
Living people
American male sprinters
African-American male track and field athletes
Athletes (track and field) at the 2008 Summer Olympics
Olympic gold medalists for the United States in track and field
Sportspeople from Pasadena, California
Medalists at the 2008 Summer Olympics
21st-century African-American sportspeople
20th-century African-American people